Stuart Organ  is a British actor.

He is best known for his portrayal of the character Mr. Robson in the children's television drama Grange Hill. Organ portrayed the series' longest-serving teacher, arriving in 1988 as the new head of PE. In 1998 he finally landed the headmaster's job, but left the series in 2003 soon after production of Grange Hill transferred to Liverpool.

Prior to Grange Hill, Organ appeared as Kevin Cross in the Mersey TV soap opera Brookside, and played Bazin in the Doctor Who story Dragonfire in 1987. Since then, he has appeared in a variety of roles on T.V., including Monk, a flasher who exposed himself to Anna and yet was defended by Miles in This Life; Richard Thornton, who stalked P.C. Sam Nixon across a double episode Special in The Bill; and later as D.I Dixon in 2000, Leighton Peters, a top Civil Servant who was responsible for the downfall of Anthony Calf's regular in a double episode of Holby City and as solicitor Steve Morris in series 13, episode 14 of London's Burning.

More recently, he has been concentrating on work in the theatre. His roles have included Guy Burgess in An Englishman Abroad (York Theatre Royal, 2003); Egeus in The Comedy of Errors (Sheffield Crucible, 2004); George in Who's Afraid of Virginia Woolf? (Queens Theatre, Hornchurch, 2005); Robert in Blue/Orange (Ipswich, 2006); and Serge in 'Art' (York Theatre Royal, 2006). He then returned to the Queens Theatre, to play Major Powell in their 2007 play "Corpse".

His regular voice work includes lip-synching and dubbing cartoons and video games, including Star Wars: The Old Republic.

References

External links

British male television actors
Living people
Year of birth missing (living people)